Husam Hourani  is a Syrian football midfielder who played for Syria in the 1984 Asian Cup.

References
Stats

External links

Living people
Syrian footballers
Syria international footballers
1980 AFC Asian Cup players
1984 AFC Asian Cup players
Association football midfielders
Year of birth missing (living people)